State Highway 351 (SH 351) is a  Texas state highway that travels from Abilene northeast to an intersection with U.S. Route 180 (US 180) west of Albany. The highway was designated on September 6, 1943 as a replacement for US 80 Alternate.

Route description
SH 351 begins at an intersection with US 83 Business (Treadaway Boulevard) in Abilene. The highway heads east through Abilene along Ambler Avenue. It curves to the northeast prior to a diamond interchange with Interstate 20 (I-20). The highway heads northeast as it leaves the Abilene city limits on its way to intersections with FM 1082, FM 604, and FM 3522. It continues to the northeast to its eastern terminus at a concurrency of US 180 and SH 6.

History
SH 351 was commissioned in September 1943 to replace part of what had previously been designated US 80 Alternate (US 80 Alt.).

Junction list

See also

References

351
Transportation in Taylor County, Texas
Transportation in Callahan County, Texas
Transportation in Jones County, Texas
Transportation in Shackelford County, Texas
Abilene, Texas
U.S. Route 80